Edward Palmer Poulton  (1883–1939) was an English physician and physiologist.

Education and career
After education at the Dragon School and at Rugby School, Edward Palmer Poulton matriculated at Balliol College, Oxford, where he graduated in natural science in 1905. Influenced by John Scott Haldane, he studied for two more years at the University of Oxford and then did his medical training at Guy's Hospital, graduating in 1910 with BM BCh and in 1913 with DM from the University of Oxford. In 1911–1912, supported by a Radcliffe travelling fellowship, he studied under Friedrich von Müller at Munich. At Guy's Hospital, Poulton was from 1912 to 1914 a demonstrator of physiology and a registrar, from 1914 to 1926 an assistant physician, and from 1926 to 1939 a full physician. He was elected FRCP in 1918. He delivered the Goulstonian Lectures in 1918 and the Oliver-Sharpey Lecture in 1928.

He joined the Physiological Society in 1909. Among his collaborators were John Scott Haldane, Joseph Barcroft, Ernest Laurence Kennaway, John Henry Ryffel, Marcus Seymour Pembrey, and George Graham.  Poulton and his collaborators did research on oesophageal pain, dissociation curves of blood, physiological effects of anoxia, and creatinine excretions in dietary modifications.

When Sir Frederick Taylor died in 1920, Poulton became the editor, assisted by C. Putnam Symonds and Harold Wordsworth Barber, for the 12th edition of Taylor's Practice of Medicine (1922) and for three subsequent editions.

Family
Edward Palmer Poulton, the elder son of Sir Edward Bagnall Poulton, F.R.S, Hope Professor of Zoology in the University of Oxford, had a younger brother, Ronald, and three sisters. Ronald Poulton (1889–1915) was a famous rugby union footballer, who died in WWI. In 1911 in Oxford, Edward Palmer Poulton married Elfrida Maclean; they had three sons and two daughters.

Selected publications
with George Graham: 

with Thomas Richard Parsons:

References

1883 births
1939 deaths
English physiologists
20th-century English medical doctors
People educated at The Dragon School
People educated at Rugby School
Alumni of Balliol College, Oxford
Physicians of Guy's Hospital
Fellows of the Royal College of Physicians